INS Sindhuratna (S59) (Jewel of the Sea) is a   diesel-electric submarine of the Indian Navy.

On 26 February 2014 smoke was detected on Indian Navy submarine INS Sindhuratna off Mumbai coast, and onboard 4-5 sailors were airlifted to a Mumbai hospital after they fell unconscious from suffocation. The senior-most submarine officer of the Western Naval Command was on board. 2 people were killed while 7 were injured. The cause of the fire remains unknown. As per reports, smoke had engulfed compartment No. 3 in the sailors’ accommodation area when the submarine was underwater during a training mission, leading to deaths and injuries.

The two officers killed in the accident were Lt. Commander Kapish Singh Muwal and Lt. Commander Manoranjan Kumar. Their funeral was conducted with full military honors, with the Naval Ensign lowered to half mast.

References

Sindhughosh-class submarines
Attack submarines
Ships built in the Soviet Union
1988 ships
Submarines of India
Indian submarine accidents